Colégio Marista de Carcavelos is a school founded by the Marist Brothers in Lisbon, Portugal, in 1965. Classes run from preschool through secondary school.

References

External links
 Colégio Marista de Carcavelos

Marist Brothers schools
Catholic schools in Portugal
Educational institutions established in 1965
Schools in Lisbon
1965 establishments in Portugal